Bimbo's Initiation is a 1931 Fleischer Studios Talkartoon animated short film starring Bimbo and featuring an early version of Betty Boop with a dog's ears and nose. It was the final Betty Boop cartoon to be animated by the character's co-creator, Grim Natwick, prior to his departure for Ub Iwerks' studio.

Plot
Bimbo is walking down the street when he suddenly disappears down an open manhole, and is subsequently locked down there by a mouse who resembles Mickey Mouse.  He lands in the underground clubhouse of a secret society. The leader asks Bimbo if he would like to be a member, but Bimbo refuses and is sent through a series of dangerous events. He is repeatedly asked by the leader to join their society, but keeps refusing. Bimbo is brought through a series of mysterious doors that lead him into yet another sub-basement. Bimbo flees through various death traps before landing in front of the mysterious order's leader again. Bimbo still refuses to become a member, but finally accepts the invitation when the leader reveals herself to be the real Betty Boop and the rest of the society members remove their costumes, showing that they are all Betty clones. Bimbo dances with all the Betties to celebrate.

Analysis and recognitions
The surreal, nightmarish atmosphere of Bimbo's Initiation has made it one of the most renowned Fleischer Studios shorts. Leonard Maltin described it as "the 'darkest' of all" the Fleischers' cartoons. In 1994 it was voted #37 of the 50 Greatest Cartoons of all time by members of the animation industry.

The cartoonist Jim Woodring identified Bimbo's Initiation as "one of the things that laid the foundation for my life's philosophy."

Trivia
The song Wanna Be a Member? is a parody written to the tune of the 1919 song the Vamp (or Vamp a Little Lady).
The film went into the public domain in 1959 after failure of renewal.

References

External links
Bimbo's Initiation on the IMDb
Bimbo's Initiation at the Big Cartoon Database
Bimbo's Initiation on YouTube

1930s American animated films
1931 animated films
American black-and-white films
Betty Boop cartoons
Fleischer Studios short films
Paramount Pictures short films
Short films directed by Dave Fleischer